was a  after Eihō and before Kanji. This period spanned the years from February 1084 through April 1087.

Change of Era
 February 9, 1084 : The new era name was created to mark an event or series of events. The previous era ended and the new one commenced in Eihō 4, on the 7th day of the 2nd month.

Events of the Ōtoku Era
 1084 (Ōtoku 1, 9th month): The empress Kenshi, the emperor's principal consort, died. Shirakawa was afflicted with great grief, and for a time, he turned over the administration of the government to his ministers.
 1086 (Ōtoku 3, 9th month): Shirakawa announced his intention to abdicate in favor of his son.
 January 3, 1087 (Ōtoku 3, 26th day of the 11th month): Shirakawa formally abdicated, and he took the title Daijō-tennō. Shirakawa had personally occupied the throne for 14 years; and for the next 43 years, he would exercise broad powers in what will come to be known as cloistered rule.

Notes

References
 Brown, Delmer M. and Ichirō Ishida, eds. (1979).  Gukanshō: The Future and the Past. Berkeley: University of California Press. ;  OCLC 251325323
 Nussbaum, Louis-Frédéric and Käthe Roth. (2005).  Japan encyclopedia. Cambridge: Harvard University Press. ;  OCLC 58053128
 Titsingh, Isaac. (1834). Nihon Ōdai Ichiran; ou,  Annales des empereurs du Japon.  Paris: Royal Asiatic Society, Oriental Translation Fund of Great Britain and Ireland. OCLC 5850691
 Varley, H. Paul. (1980). A Chronicle of Gods and Sovereigns: Jinnō Shōtōki of Kitabatake Chikafusa. New York: Columbia University Press. ;  OCLC 6042764

External links
 National Diet Library, "The Japanese Calendar" -- historical overview plus illustrative images from library's collection

Japanese eras